El Hijo del Ahuizote (English: The Son of Ahuizotl) was a satirical Mexican newspaper founded in 1885 by Daniel Cabrera Rivera, Manuel Pérez Bibbins, and Juan Sarabia. In July 1902, Ricardo and Enrique Flores Magón took over and expanded the publication. After their takeover, the content and caricatures were used to satirize and oppose Porfirio Díaz. The newspaper is considered to be important to the Mexican Revolution.

References 

Satirical newspapers
Publications established in 1885
Defunct newspapers published in Mexico
Political mass media in Mexico
1885 in Mexico
1902 in Mexico
Porfiriato